Andrea Gutierrez may refer to:

Andrea Gutierrez (judoka), competitor in the 2014 World Judo Championships – Women's 63 kg
Andrea Gutierrez; see List of Person of Interest episodes